Ihor Yaroslavovych Khudobyak is a Ukrainian professional footballer who plays as a midfielder for Ethnikos Achna in Cyprus.

Club career
Khudobyak was born on 20 February 1985 in Ivano-Frankivsk. Before joining Karpaty, Khudobyak played for the club Spartak Ivano-Frankivsk. In Lviv he quickly secured a place in first team and became one of the fan favorites.

In March 2017 Khudobyak was selected as a player of the month in the Ukrainian Premier League, while playing for FC Karpaty Lviv.

Khudobyak joined Cyprus club Ethnikos Achna on 1 January 2019.

International career
Khudobyak was called up to Ukraine national football team for the 2010 FIFA World Cup qualification matches against Greece on 14 November and 18 November 2009, but did not take part in either match.

He finally debuted for the national team on 29 May 2010 in a friendly game against Romania national football team.

Honours
Rostov
 Russian Cup: 2013–14

Karpaty Lviv
 Ukrainian First League: 2005–06

Ethnikos Achna
Cypriot Cup runner-up: 2021–22

References

External links
 
 
 

1985 births
Living people
Association football midfielders
Ukrainian footballers
Ukraine under-21 international footballers
Ukraine international footballers
FC Chornohora Ivano-Frankivsk players
FC Karpaty Lviv players
FC Spartak Ivano-Frankivsk players
FC Rostov players
FC Akzhayik players
Ethnikos Achna FC players
Ukrainian Premier League players
Ukrainian First League players
Ukrainian Second League players
Russian Premier League players
Cypriot First Division players
Cypriot Second Division players
Kazakhstan Premier League players
Ukrainian expatriate footballers
Ukrainian expatriate sportspeople in Russia
Expatriate footballers in Russia
Ukrainian expatriate sportspeople in Kazakhstan
Expatriate footballers in Kazakhstan
Expatriate footballers in Cyprus
Ukrainian expatriate sportspeople in Cyprus
Sportspeople from Ivano-Frankivsk